Adam Barrett (born 30 July 1992) is an English butterfly and freestyle swimmer. In 2014, he swam the butterfly leg for the 4×100 m medley relay teams that won gold medals at the Commonwealth Games and European Championships.

References

External links 
 

1992 births
Living people
English male freestyle swimmers
Male butterfly swimmers
English male swimmers
Commonwealth Games gold medallists for England
Commonwealth Games bronze medallists for England
Commonwealth Games medallists in swimming
Swimmers at the 2014 Commonwealth Games
Swimmers at the 2022 Commonwealth Games
21st-century English people
Medallists at the 2014 Commonwealth Games